Portraits of Cuba is an album by Cuban musician Paquito D'Rivera, released through Chesky Records in 1996. In 1997, the album won D'Rivera the Grammy Award for Best Latin Jazz performance.

Track listing
 "La Bella Cubana" (White) – 5:14
 "The Peanut Vendor" (L. Wolfe Gilbert, Moisés Simons, Marion Sunshine) – 4:38
 "Tú" (DeFuentes, Fuentes) – 5:35
 "Tú, Mi Delirio" (De La Luz) – 6:31
 "No Te Importe Saber" (Touzet) – 5:42
 "Drume Negrita" (Grenet, Grenet) – 4:18
 "Portraits of Cuba" (D'Rivera) – 5:04
 "Excerpt from 'Aires Tropicales'" (D'Rivera) – 0:48
 "Mariana" (Franzetti) – 5:30
 "Como Arrullo de Palmas" (Lecuona) – 3:22
 "Échale Salsita" (Pineiro) – 5:06
 "Song to My Son" (D'Rivera) – 5:22
 "Theme from 'I Love Lucy'" (Harold Adamson, Daniel, Daniel) – 3:25

References

1997 albums
Chesky Records albums
Grammy Award for Best Latin Jazz Album
Paquito D'Rivera albums